Acacia nanodealbata, known colloquially as dwarf silver-wattle, is a species of Acacia native to Australia.

References

nanodealbata
Fabales of Australia